In the 2003–04 season Panathinaikos played for 45th consecutive time in Greece's top division, Alpha Ethniki. They also competed in UEFA Champions League, UEFA Cup and Greek Cup.

First-team squad
Squad at end of season

Team kit

Competitions

Alpha Ethniki

Classification

Greek Cup

Final

UEFA Champions League

Group E

UEFA Cup

Round of 32

References

External links
 Panathinaikos FC official website

Panathinaikos F.C. seasons
Panathinaikos
Greek football championship-winning seasons